The Catepanate of Ras was a province (catepanate) of the Byzantine Empire, established around 971 in central regions of early medieval Serbia, during the rule of Byzantine Emperor John Tzimiskes (969–976). The catepanate was named after the fortified town of Ras, eponymous for the historical region of Raška. The province was short-lived, and collapsed soon after 976, following the Byzantine retreat from the region after the restoration of the Bulgarian Empire.

History

In the middle of the 6th century, during the reign of Byzantine emperor Justinian I (d. 565), a fortress of Arsa in the province of Dardania was refortified, as attested by historian Procopius. At the beginning of the 7th century, Byzantine rule collapsed, and the region was settled by Serbs. Up to the middle of the 10th century, the fortress of Ras was a stronghold of the early medieval Principality of Serbia, as attested by the Byzantine emperor and historian Constantine VII Porphyrogenitus (d. 959) in his work De Administrando Imperio. By that time, following the Christianization of the Serbs, the Eparchy of Ras was also created.

The earliest possible date of later Byzantine invasion of Serbian lands and the creation of a province is around 971, when Byzantine armies conquered Bulgaria and re-established Byzantine supreme rule over the interior of Southeastern Europe, including the central Serbian lands, as attested by the Chronicle of the Priest of Duklja. One of the newly formed administrative units was the Catepanate of Ras. It was established as a Byzantine stronghold in Serbian lands, but its territorial jurisdiction can not be precisely determined. The Catepanate was short-lived, as well as the Byzantine rule in the rest of Bulgarian and Serbian lands. After the death of emperor John (976), a successful uprising started in the South Slavic provinces of the Byzantine Empire, led by Cometopuli, resulting in total breakdown of Byzantine power in the region and the restoration of the Bulgarian Empire.

The main sources for the organization of the Catepanate of Ras is a seal of a strategos of Ras, dated to the reign of Byzantine Emperor John Tzimiskes (969–976). The seal belonged to protospatharios and katepano of Ras named John.

After 976, the region was dominated by the restored Bulgarian Empire, that had complex relations with neighbouring Serbian princes. Byzantine rule in the region was restored in 1018, under emperor Basil II (d. 1025), and new administrative units in Serbian lands were created, including new themes, one centered in the region of Syrmia to the north (Theme of Sirmium), and other in central Serbia (Theme of Serbia).

See also
 Early Medieval Principality of Serbia
 Chronicle of the Priest of Duklja
 Sviatoslav's invasion of Bulgaria
 Byzantine conquest of Bulgaria
 Raška (region)

References

Sources

 
 
 
 
 
 
 
 
 
 

 
 
 
 
 
 

Provinces of the Byzantine Empire
Byzantine Serbia
10th century in Serbia
States and territories established in the 970s
Principality of Serbia (early medieval)
971 establishments
976 disestablishments
States and territories disestablished in the 970s